The Andalusia Rams (also known as the Bulldogs) was a minor league baseball team based in Andalusia, Alabama, USA that played from 1937 to 1941. They played in the Alabama–Florida League from 1937–1939 and the Alabama State League. Brief Major league baseball players Royce Lint, Yam Yaryan and Howie Gorman played for them, along with All-Star pitcher Virgil Trucks .

After World War II, the Andalusia Arrows joined the Alabama State League and played through 1954.

In 1962, the Los Angeles Dodgers moved the Panama City Fliers to Andalusia, where they played as the Andalusia Dodgers until they moved to Ozark, Alabama on July 10.

The ballparks

Andalusia teams played their home games at Andalusia Municipal Stadium (1947–1954, 1962), Channell-Lee Park (1954), Fairgrounds Park (1937–1941) and Elementary School Park (1936).

Notable alumni

Virgil Trucks (1937) 2 time MLB All-Star

References

External links
Baseball Reference

Baseball teams established in 1936
Defunct minor league baseball teams
Los Angeles Dodgers minor league affiliates
Professional baseball teams in Alabama
Baseball teams disestablished in 1962
Defunct Alabama-Florida League teams
Defunct Alabama State League teams
1936 establishments in Alabama
1962 disestablishments in Alabama
Defunct baseball teams in Alabama
Alabama State League teams